Corocora Airport  is one of several airstrips serving the oil and gas-producing region of Trinidad municipality in the Casanare Department of Colombia.

The region is lightly populated.

See also

Transport in Colombia
List of airports in Colombia

References

Airports in Colombia